Anniella alexanderae, also known as the temblor legless lizard, is a species of legless lizard found in California,

References

Anniella
Reptiles described in 2013
Lizards of North America
Fauna of California
Taxa named by Theodore Johnstone Papenfuss